Gunnar Stavseth (born 2 April 1943) is a Norwegian journalist and politician for the Conservative Party.

His father Reidar Stavseth was editor-in-chief of different newspapers through his career, and so Gunnar grew up in Trondheim, Bodø, Porsgrunn and Tønsberg. Gunnar Stavseth, having graduated as cand.mag. from the University of Oslo, later became a journalist in Adresseavisen and Aftenposten. He was later chief editor of Norges Industri, a magazine published by the Federation of Norwegian Industries, and of the Conservative Party Press Office (Høyres Pressebyrå).

While a student, Gunnar Stavseth was for a period chairman of the Conservative Students' Association, vice chair of Norwegian Students' Society and member of the editorial board of Minerva, a conservative magazine.

He served as a deputy representative to the Norwegian Parliament from Sør-Trøndelag during the term 1969–1973. In total he met during 20 days of parliamentary session.

He resides at Grav.

References

1943 births
Living people
Deputy members of the Storting
Conservative Party (Norway) politicians
Sør-Trøndelag politicians
Norwegian journalists
Norwegian magazine editors
University of Oslo alumni